The 1877 Salford by-election was fought on 19 April 1877.  The byelection was fought due to the death of the incumbent Conservative MP, Charles Edward Cawley.  It was won by the Conservative candidate Oliver Ormerod Walker.

References

1877 elections in the United Kingdom
1877 in England
1870s in Lancashire
Politics of Salford
By-elections to the Parliament of the United Kingdom in Greater Manchester constituencies
By-elections to the Parliament of the United Kingdom in Lancashire constituencies